Susan Wooldridge (born 31 July 1950) is a British actress. She won the BAFTA Award for Best Actress in a Supporting Role for Hope and Glory (1987). Her television credits include Jewel in the Crown, (1984), All Quiet on the Preston Front (1994–95), and Twenty Thousand Streets Under the Sky (2005).

Early life
Wooldridge was born in London, England, and educated at convent schools, the Central School of Speech and Drama, and L'Ecole Jacques Lecoq, Paris. She is the daughter of actress Margaretta Scott and composer John Wooldridge. Her brother is Hugh Wooldridge.

Career

Acting 
Wooldridge has been acting since 1971. Her big break came in 1984 with The Jewel in the Crown, in which she played the pivotal character of Daphne Manners whose affection for the handsome Hari Kumar doomed him. For this role she received a BAFTA nomination and the ALVA Award for Best Actress. She has appeared in many British and co-British film productions, including The Shout (1978), The Last Place On Earth (1985) miniseries in which she played the role of Kathleen Scott (wife of Robert Falcon Scott), Loyalties (1986), Hope and Glory (1987) for which she won the BAFTA for Best Supporting Actress 1988, How to Get Ahead in Advertising (1989), Bye Bye Blues (1989), Twenty-One (1991), Afraid of the Dark (1991) and Just like a Woman (1992). Her recent film appearances have included Tamara Drewe (2010) and The Lady (2011).

She also appeared in many US/British TV productions, such as Dame Agatha Christie's mystery, Dead Man's Folly (1986) which starred Sir Peter Ustinov, Jean Stapleton, Tim Pigott-Smith, and Constance Cummings and the series, Ticket To Ride.

She has appeared in such British TV shows, Bergerac 1990 'The Dig', and a two series of Preston Front (Best Comedy Award 1995), Twenty Thousand Streets Under the Sky (Best mini-series nomination), Underworld (Best Comedy Award 1998), Poirot: Cat Among the Pigeons, Bad Company (the case of The Bridgewater Four miscarriage of justice), Pinochet’s Progress, Mrs. Bradley Mysteries, The Hummingbird Tree, A Very English Scandal, Lewis and Doctors. She continues to work on the British stage playing Lady Bracknell in The Importance of Being Earnest in London in 2009 as well as plays by new writers.

In 2017, Wooldridge played The Nurse in the American television period drama series Still Star-Crossed.

Writing
In July 2009, her first novel, The Hidden Dance, was published in the United Kingdom by Allison & Busby, and won the Best Red Read for Best Debut Novel 2010.

Personal life 
She lives in London with her partner, the actor and writer, Andy de la Tour.

References

External links

1950 births
Living people
Actresses from London
English television actresses
Best Supporting Actress BAFTA Award winners
English film actresses